Mezitli is a municipality and district governorate in Greater Mersin, Turkey.  Mersin is one of 30 metropolitan centers in Turkey with more than one municipality within city borders. Now in Mersin there are four second-level municipalities in addition to Greater Mersin (büyükşehir) municipality. The Mayor of Mezitli is Neşet Tarhan.

Geography 

Mezitli at about  composes the western part of Mersin proper. Southern quarters of Mezitli are popularly known as Viranşehir ("ruined city") because of the ruins. (see below) Yenişehir, another municipality of Mersin, is to the east of Mezitli, Mediterranean Sea is in the south and Toros Mountains in the north. In the west of Mezitli there are summer houses and coastal villages most of which are specialized in citrus industry. Mezitli River (Liparis of the antiquity) flows within Mezitli.

History 

The ruins of the ancient Greek city of Soli, which was renamed by Roman general Pompey as Pompeipolis (Πομπηιόπολη) is within Mezitli.  Soli was the dominion of Rhodes, Persian Empire (Achaemenids), Macedonian Empire, Seleucid Empire, Roman Empire and its successor Byzantine Empire. But after the great earthquake in 528,  the city lost its former glory. In later years, the ruins of the city was a part of Umayyad Caliphate, Seljuk Sultanate of Rum, Crusades, Armenian Kingdom of Cilicia, Ramadanids, and Ottoman Empire. In the early 20th century, there was only a small village just north of Soli, named after "Mezitoğlu", an Oghuz tribe. The town municipality was established in 1968.  But after the fast growth in population, the district of Mezitli is established within Greater Mersin and the municipality became one of Mersin intracity municipalities in 2008.

Population 

According to 2021 figures the population of Mezitli is  218,816 (106,285 male and  112,531 female citizens). 
As of 2021 approximately 20% of Mersin citizens are living in Mezitli.

Living 

Mezitli is known as a district of middle class residences. Most of Mezitli citizens are either retired or active working people. (Most of business offices are in the other municipalities of Mersin.)

Rural area
There are 15 villages and two towns in the rural area of Mezitli. The total population of the district is (urban and rural) 218,816

International relations

Mezitli is twinned with:
 Tempelhof-Schöneberg borough of Berlin, Germany
 Çatalköy, Northern Cyprus

See also 

Mersin province
Mersin
Akdeniz
Yenişehir
Toroslar

References and Notes 

Populated places in Mersin Province
 
Districts of Mersin Province